Wincanton Classic (also known as Leeds International Classic and Rochester International Classic) was a cycling classic taking place in the United Kingdom as part of the UCI Road World Cup.

It was first held in 1989 in Newcastle, moving to Brighton in 1990 and 1991. The following year it was moved to Leeds, to be known as Leeds International Classic between 1994 and 1996. In its last year it was held in Rochester as Rochester International Classic. In 1998 it was replaced in the UCI Road World Cup by the HEW Cyclassics.

Winners

External links 
Profile by memoire-du-cyclisme.net 

UCI Road World Cup races
Cycle races in England
Classic cycle races
Recurring sporting events established in 1989
Defunct cycling races in the United Kingdom
Recurring sporting events disestablished in 1997
1989 establishments in England
1997 disestablishments in England